Linder Stadium at the Ring Tennis Complex is the intercollegiate tennis facility at the University of Florida in Gainesville, Florida.  It is home stadium and training facility for the Florida Gators women's tennis and the Florida Gators men's tennis teams.

Stadium 

Linder Stadium is a 1,000-seat tennis stadium within the Ring Tennis Complex located on S.W. Second Avenue on the northern edge of the University of Florida's Gainesville, Florida campus.  The stadium, named for donor R. Scott Linder, was built in 1987 and includes six lighted courts and a spectator grandstand.

Renovation 

In 1999, the Linder Stadium was renovated as part of a $1.7 million project that created the Alfred Ring Tennis Complex, named in honor of Dr. Alfred A. Ring, a university benefactor.  A pressbox was constructed atop the grandstand, and scoreboards were added for each of the original six courts.  New restrooms and concession stands are located under the grandstand. 
 
A second row of nine courts was built, with three of the courts covered by the new Ring Pavilion. This building is the primary training facility for the men's and women's teams, and includes training rooms, locker rooms and coaches' offices.
A  courtyard was also constructed.

Facility awards 

Following its renovation, the Ring Tennis Complex received a Silver Award for beautification from the city of Gainesville.  Also in 1999, the United States Tennis Association named the Ring Tennis Complex as an Outstanding Tennis Facility.  The complex also was honored with the Facility of Merit Award from Athletic Business magazine in 2001.

See also 

 Bryan Shelton
 Buildings at the University of Florida
 Florida Gators
 History of the University of Florida
 Roland Thornqvist
 University Athletic Association

References

External links 

 GatorSports.com – Gators sports news from the Gainesville Sun.
 Gatorzone.com – Official website of the Florida Gators.
 SECSports.com – Official website of the Southeastern Conference.
University Athletic Association – Official website of the University Athletic Association, Inc.
 University of Florida – Official website of the University of Florida.

Buildings at the University of Florida
Florida Gators men's tennis
Florida Gators women's tennis
College tennis venues in the United States
Tennis venues in Florida
1987 establishments in Florida
Sports venues completed in 1987